Vinča may refer to:

 Vinča, a suburb of Belgrade
 Vinča-Belo Brdo, an archaeological site in the Belgrade suburb
 Vinča culture, an archaeological culture named after the archaeological site
 Vinča Nuclear Institute, also near Belgrade

See also
 Vinca (disambiguation)